Morabito is a French luxury brand founded in 1905 in Nice by Jean-Baptiste Morabito. Morabito has been specializing in handmade leather goods made by its artisans, Atelier of Morabito, located in Paris. The founder started his career as a jewel artisan.

Philosophy
Philosophy of Jean-Baptiste Morabito: "Luxury is not exceptional, it is the exceptional which is luxurious".

History

1880s  :  1885, November 28, Jean-Baptiste Morabito was born in Naples. He was 20 when he opened a jewelry atelier and boutique in Nice in 1905. In his atelier, he made pieces in tortoiseshell, coral and mother-of-pearl, accenting them with gold and silver. His boutique had clients such as the people who vacationed on the Côte d’Azur.

1910s  :  During the Belle Epoque, Jean-Baptiste Morabito started making evening bags by requests of ladies for parties in the Côte d’Azur. Silk evening clutches were embroidered with beads and gold. Tortoiseshell clasps inset with precious stones. Tortoises from Central America, crocodiles from Java and the Nile.

1920s  :  In 1921, Jean-Baptiste Morabito opened a boutique on the rue Saint Honoré in Paris. He began making trunks and baggage. His atelier produced embroidered cases and luggage. They were often in precious leathers such as exotic leathers especially crocodile.

1940s  :  After World War II, Morabito made Morabito’s N°7 perfume, accompanied by a rice powder. The crystal Lalique bottle of perfume had the form of four tortoises. During that period, Morabito made the bags with shoulder straps.

1950s  :  In 1951, Jean-Baptiste Morabito opened his boutique at 1 Place Vendome in Paris, on the corner of the rue Saint Honoré. In 1958, when Marilyn Monroe wanted a vanity case for traveling, Morabito created a classic the Orsay bag.

1960s  :  In 1961, the Traviata and Verdi models were dedicated to Maria Callas. Kings  ordered crocodile trunks or shark desk sets.

1970s  :  In 1971, Madame of French President Pompidou offered a Vendôme bag and Princess bag to the Japanese Empress during their official visit to France.

1990s  :  In 1996, Morabito opened a boutique on the Avenue Georges V in Paris.

2000s  :  In 2007, Morabito moved the boutique again on the rue Saint Honoré in Paris.  In 2010, November 28, ceremony of the 125th anniversary of Jean-Baptiste Morabito's birthday.

External links
MORABITO Official Website

French brands
1905 establishments in France